David Maitland Maitland-Titterton   (1904 – 1988) was a Scottish British Army officer and officer of arms.

Maitland-Titterton was a commissioned officer in the Ayrshire Yeomanry and retired with the honorary rank of major in 1964. He was an officer of arms in the Court of the Lord Lyon, serving as Falkland Pursuivant from 1969 to 1971, Ormond Pursuivant from 1971 to 1982 and Marchmont Herald between 1982 and his death in 1988.

References

1904 births
1988 deaths
Ayrshire (Earl of Carrick's Own) Yeomanry officers
Scottish officers of arms